S36 may refer to:

Aviation 
 Blériot-SPAD S.36, a French reconnaissance aircraft
 Junkers S 36, a German mail plane
 Norm Grier Field, in King County, Washington, United States
 Short S.36, a British biplane
 Sikorsky S-36, an American amphibious sesquiplane

Chemistry
 S36: Wear suitable protective clothing, a safety phrase
 Sulfur-36, an isotope of sulfur

Naval vessels 
 , a torpedo boat of the Imperial German Navy
 , a submarine of the United States Navy

Other uses
 S36 (ZVV), a line of the Zürich S-Bahn
 IBM System/36, a minicomputer
 Woiwurrung language
 S36, a postcode district in Sheffield, England

See also
 36S (disambiguation)